John Harvey Stock (born March 7, 1933) is a former American football player who played for Pittsburgh Steelers of the National Football League (NFL). He played college football at the University of Pittsburgh.

References

1933 births
Living people
American football ends
Pittsburgh Steelers players
Pittsburgh Panthers football players
People from Weirton, West Virginia